The 2014–15 Israel Youth State Cup (Gvia HaMedina LeNoar) was the 60th season of Israel's nationwide football cup competition.

The competition was won by Hapoel Tel Aviv, who had beaten Ironi Kiryat Shmona 8–7 on penalties, after 0–0 in the final.

Results

First round
Matches were played between 12 and 16 September 2014. Maccabi Netivot received a bye to the second round.

Second round
Matches were played on 10 and 11 October 2014. Ironi Tiberias and Hakoah Amidar Ramat Gan received a bye to the third round.

Third round
Matches were played on 6 and 7 December 2014. Ironi Tiberias, Hapoel Ihud Bnei Jatt, Bnei Yehuda, Maccabi Yavne, Hakoah Amidar Ramat Gan and Maccabi Ironi Bat Yam received a bye to the fourth round.

Fourth round

Round of 16

Quarter-finals

Semi-finals

Final

Notes

References

External links
 Israel Football Association website 

Israel Youth State Cup
State Youth Cup